Findlay High School is a public high school in Findlay, Ohio. It is the only high school in the Findlay City School District, and the second largest high school in northwest Ohio. Their nickname is the Trojans. They are members of the Three Rivers Athletic Conference. They have a respected performing arts program.

Demographics

Student groups
Findlay First Edition Show Choir, show choir (also known as FFE or 'First Edition').
Voices In Perfection, the freshman show choir, also known as VIP. Every year VIP has competed at the Heritage fest, they have received a Gold rating.
Blue & Gold, the student newspaper. In the 2013-2014 school year, the paper received the National Student Press Association's Pacemaker award in the "Newspapers 8 pages or fewer" category at both the Fall National High School Journalism Conventions hosted by NSPA and the Journalism Education Association.
Pantasia, the steel drum band. They have been on many cruises to perform.
Latin Club, functions as a local chapter of both the Ohio Junior Classical League (OJCL) and National Junior Classical League (NJCL).
Junior Statesmen of America, functions as a local chapter of the Ohio River Valley Junior Statesmen of America group. Students raise funds for the Tanga-Tanzania Rotary Club and have debates about public policy.
Sketch Comedy Club, a group dedicated to writing and presenting comedy sketches.
Books 'N' Brownies, a book club.

Ohio High School Athletic Association State Championships

 Boys Baseball – 1971
 Boys Basketball – 1948
 Boys Cross Country – 1974
 Boys Golf – 1984
 Boys Ice hockey – 1978, 1979, 1983
 Boys Swimming and Diving – 1944
 Boys Soccer (State Runner-Up) - 1995

Note: The Boys' ice hockey team (1971) and football team (1926) each won state championships in their respective sport before they were sanctioned OHSAA sports.

Notable alumni
 Gavin Creel, singer/songwriter and Tony Award winning Broadway performer
 David Cryer, actor, singer
 Peter FitzSimons, Australian Rugby player and author
 Josh Huston, NFL football player
 John Kidd, NFL football kicker
 John Poff, MLB player
 Tot Pressnell, MLB player
 James Purdy, writer, poet and playwright
 Ben Roethlisberger, NFL Quarterback

Notes and references

External links
 District website

Educational institutions established in 1827
Findlay, Ohio
High schools in Hancock County, Ohio
Public high schools in Ohio
1827 establishments in Ohio